In the field of sociology, the term Disneyfication—or Disneyization—describes the commercial transformation of things (e.g. entertainment) or environments into something simplified, controlled, and 'safe'—reminiscent of the Walt Disney brand (such as its media, parks, etc.).

It broadly describes the processes of stripping a real place or thing of its original character, and representing it in a sanitized format: references to anything negative or inconvenient are removed, and the facts are dumbed down with the intent of rendering the subject more pleasant and easily grasped. In the case of physical places, this involves replacing the real with an idealized, tourist-friendly veneer—resembling the "Main Street, U.S.A." attractions at Disney theme parks.

Based on rapid Western-style globalization and consumerist lifestyles, the term Disneyfication is mostly used derogatorily to imply the social and cultural homogenization of things. In this sense, to Disneyfy "means to translate or transform an object into something superficial and even simplistic." Disneyfication can also be used to describe the internationalization of American mass culture; the notion of entertainment that is bigger, faster, and better but with worldwide, Americanized uniformity.

More specifically, some may use Disneyfication to be associated with a statement about the cultural products of the Disney company itself, denoting the general process of rendering material (a fairy tale, novel, historical event) into a standardized format that is recognizable as being a product of the Walt Disney Company.

Development 
The term Disneyfication first appeared in 1959, while Disneyization was coined by New York University's Peter K. Fallon.

The latter was popularized by Alan Bryman in The Disneyization of Society (2004), in which he described it as "the process by which the principles of the Disney theme parks are coming to dominate more and more sectors of American society as well as the rest of the world."  Though the two are largely used interchangeably, Bryman states his preference of Disneyization over Disneyfication because he takes the latter to be accompanied with negative connotations.

Bryman described four dimensions of Disneyization in particular:
 Theming – where an institution or object is placed into a narrative that is mostly unrelated to the institution or object to which it is applied. Example: themed restaurants (e.g. Rainforest Cafe), or themed hotels on the Las Vegas Strip.
 Hybrid consumption – where multiple forms of consumption that are associated with different industries become "interlocked with each other." Example: restaurants at IKEA and Costco.
 Merchandising – the promotion and sale of goods or services with objects bearing copyright images and/or logos. Example: Clothing, pens, and stationery with New York City branding.
 Performative labor – making employees not only providers of services, but also of entertainment; in other words, frontline service work is made a performance.

Writer Andre Kehoe describes 'Disneyization' as a "bogus culture imposed hour after hour on the people by the media" that is a serious interference with free thinking and therefore free action."

See also 

 Celebration, Florida
Dumbing down
Similar concepts
 Cocacolonization
 McDonaldization
 Walmarting

References

Further reading

 Bryman, Alan E. 2004. The Disneyization of Society. UK: SAGE Publications. .Chapter one.
 Ferrell, Jeff. 2001. Tearing Down the Streets: Adventures in Urban Anarchy. St. Martin's Press. — discusses the Disneyfication of urban space
 Gill, Brendan. 1991. "The Sky Line: Disneyitis." The New Yorker (1991 April 29):96-99.
Kehoe, Andre. 1991. "Christian Contradictions and the World Revolution: Letters to my Son." Glendale Publishing.
 Roost, Frank. 2000. Die Disneyfizierung der Städte (in German). Vs Verlag.
Schickel, Richard. 1998. The Disney Version: The Life, Times, Art, and Commerce of Walt Disney. New York: Simon and Schuster.
Zukin, Sharon. 1996. The Cultures of Cities. Blackwell Publishing.

External links

 A Reader's Guide to Disneyfication
 Jean Baudrillard's. Disneyworld Company. European Graduate School

Social change
The Walt Disney Company
Cultural globalization
1990s neologisms